The Stinson Junior was a high-winged American monoplane of the late 1920s, built for private owners, and was one of the first such designs to feature a fully enclosed cabin.

Design and development
Stinson Aircraft had introduced their large high-winged six-seat SM-1 Detroiter in 1927. The SM-1 was sold successfully to airlines and other commercial operators, but it was too large to appeal to private owners.

Stinson therefore redesigned the aircraft with shorter span wings, shorter fuselage and a choice of less powerful engines as the SM-2 Junior. The aircraft was a strut-braced high-wing monoplane with a sturdy outrigger undercarriage which was braced against the wing support struts and the initial 110 h.p. Warner Scarab engine was normally left uncowled. The first SM-2 flew in mid-1928 and deliveries commenced that year. Later versions of the SM-2 had higher-powered engines of between 165 h.p. and 225 h.p.

The design was further developed to produce the more powerful and heavier SM-7 and SM-8 models which were full four-seaters and these were also used by commercial firms. The Junior R of 1932 had a deeper fuselage and a low-set stub wing to mount the undercarriage and wing struts.

Operational history
The various Stinson Junior models were in production between 1928 and 1933, being bought by both wealthy private flyers and commercial enterprises. A total of 321 Juniors were built, of which 27 survived in 2001 and several of these were airworthy in private hands. In 1977, the Experimental Aircraft Association painted an SM-8A "Spirit of EAA", and flew a cross-country tour as the support plane with a "spirit of St. Louis" replica as part of the 50th anniversary of Lindbergh's Trans-Atlantic crossing.

Variants
(per Simpson, 2001, pp. 523–524)
SM-2  Warner Scarab 110 h.p.
SM-2AA  Wright J6-5 165 h.p.
SM-2AB  Wright J5 220 h.p.
SM-2AC  Wright J6-7 225 h.p.
SM-2ACS floatplane version of the SM-2AC
SM-7A  Wright J6-9 300 h.p.
SM-7B  Wasp Junior 300 h.p.
SM-8A  Lycoming R-680 215 h.p.
SM-8B  Wright J6-7 225 h.p.
SM-8D  Packard DR-980 diesel 225 h.p.
Junior R  Lycoming R-680 215 h.p. and deeper fuselage. 28 Units built
Junior R-2  Lycomong R-680-BA 240 h.p. 3 Built.
Junior R-3  as R-2 with retractable undercarriage 3 Units built.
Junior R-3-S  Lycoming R-680-6 245 h.p. 
Junior S  Lycoming R-680 215 h.p. with fully cowled engine
Junior W  generally similar to the SM-7B, powered by a Wasp Junior engine

Specifications (SM-2AC)

References
Notes

Bibliography

External links

 aerofiles
 Stinson "S" Junior, NC-10888

Junior
1920s United States civil utility aircraft
High-wing aircraft
Single-engined tractor aircraft
Aircraft first flown in 1928